Jojua is a Georgian surname. Notable people with the surname include:
Ana Jojua (born 2001), Georgian footballer 
Liana Jojua (born 1995), Georgian mixed martial artist

Surnames of Georgian origin
Georgian-language surnames
Surnames of Abkhazian origin